Lejogaster tarsata is a Palearctic hoverfly

Description
External images
For terms see Morphology of Diptera
The thorax and abdomen are lustrous metallic green to golden, frequently with reddish reflections. The tergite at the tip of the abdomen is yellowish-green with blue and purple reflections except around the margin. In the male the face lacks a median tubercle.
The third segment of antennae below for greater or lesser part narrow and part yellow towards the tip. Middle segment of tarsi yellow. Body length 5.0 to 7.0 mm. The larva is described and figured by Rotheray (1994).

Distribution
Scandinavia south to the Mediterranean basin. From Ireland east through Central Europe and Southern Europe into European Russia, Iran and Afghanistan, Uzbekistan,
Tajikistan, Kirghizia, Turkmenia and Kazakhstan to Mongolia, Siberia and the Russian Far East.

Habitat
Wetland, margins of streams and pools, springs and spring-fed ponds.

Biology
Flies in a zigzag, darting fashion from May to August. Flowers visited are white umbellifers Matricaria, Ranunculus.

References

Diptera of Europe
Eristalinae
Insects described in 1822
Taxa named by Johann Wilhelm Meigen